Multan Medical and Dental College abbreviated as MMDC, established in 2008, is a private college of medical and dental school, in Multan, Punjab, Pakistan.

It is registered with PMDC, affiliated with UHS and approved by Ministry of Health. 500 bedded Ibn–e–Siena Hospital is attached to the college as a training and teaching hospital. The college enrolls 150 students for the five year MBBS program, and 50 students for the four year Dental(BDS) program annually.

See also
 Nishtar Medical College
 Nishtar Institute of Dentistry

External links
Profile at IMED.

Medical colleges in Punjab, Pakistan
Dental schools in Pakistan
2008 establishments in Pakistan
Educational institutions established in 2008
Universities and colleges in Multan